Gramophone or phonograph is a device for the mechanical recording and reproduction of sound.

Gramophone may also refer to:

Businesses
 Gramophone Company, a British record company
 Gramophone Company of India or Saregama, an Indian record company
 Berliner Gramophone, an early American record company 
 Deutsche Grammophon, a German classical music record label

Other uses
 Gramophone (film), a 2003 Indian film
 Gramophone (magazine), a British monthly classical music publication
 Gramophone Classical Music Awards, annual honours for the classical music industry
 Grammy Award or Gramophone Award, annual awards presented by The Recording Academy
 Gramophone, a 1986 album by Echo City

See also
 Gramaphone Records, a music store in Chicago, U.S.